Mikėnas is a Lithuanian language family name. It may refer to:
Vladas Mikėnas (1910–1992), Lithuanian chessmaster
Antanas Mikėnas (1924–1994), Lithuanian athlete 
 (1901–1964), Lithianian sculptor

Lithuanian-language surnames